The meteor shower of the July Pegasids occurs between July 23 and Aug 3. It is a weak meteor shower that has its maximum around July 28 having a ZHR of only 5 meteors per hour. The meteors have, however, an atmosphere entry speed of about 64 km/s.

The Radiant of the Pegasids is in the constellation of Pegasus, around 5 degrees to the west of the star α Pegasi. The origin of this meteor shower is probably the comet C/1979 Y1 (Bradfield). C/1979 Y1 has an orbital period of 300 years.

For Central Europe, the best time to watch them is the second half of the night, as the radiant reaches at that time a sufficient height over the horizon.

References 

Meteor showers
July events